Vladimir Koman Jr. (born 16 March 1989) is a Ukrainian-born Hungarian professional footballer who plays as an attacking midfielder for Hungarian second-tier NB II team Diósgyőr.

Club career
Koman was born in Uzhhorod, Zakarpattia Oblast, Ukrainian Soviet Socialist Republic, Soviet Union. When he was a child, in 1991, his family moved to Szombathely, where he played his first matches for the local football team Haladás and made his debut in the NB2 league at age 15. His father, Volodymyr Koman, was also a football player. Koman played 25 matches and scored three goals in the 2004–05 season of the Hungarian National Championship II.

Sampdoria
After joining Italian club Sampdoria, Koman made his Serie A debut on 7 April 2007 starting in the home match against Torino, recording the assist for the match's only goal, scored by Emiliano Bonazzoli. He then led Sampdoria to win the 2007–08 Campionato Nazionale Primavera title, and also took part at the 2008 UEFA European Under-19 Championship captaining the Hungary under-19 national team.

Koman spent the 2008–09 season on loan to Avellino. He scored four goals in 28 matches in Serie B for Avellino.

For the 2009–10, Koman was loaned to Bari. He scored his first Serie A goal against Palermo in a 4–2 win on 30 January 2010, making him the first Hungarian player to score in the Italian top flight in 15 years. He finished the season with two goals in 16 appearances.

Koman re-joined Sampdoria for the 2010–11 season, becoming a regular member of the squad. In the 2010–11 UEFA Europa League, he assisted a goal against PSV, and scored his first goal against Metalist Kharkiv in the 32nd minute of a Europa League match. Koman was appointed as a captain against Debrecen in the last round of the 2010–11 Europa League.

Monaco
On 31 January 2012, Koman joined Monaco on a four-and-a-half-year contract. His contract with Sampdoria was set to expire in May 2012. On 15 April, Koman was interviewed after the victory against Metz; he iterated he is expecting his first goal and enjoyed playing in Ligue 2. However, after 17 matches, he left the club for Russian Premier League side Krasnodar.

Krasnodar
In June 2012, Koman signed a contract with Krasnodar. On 23 July, he made his Premier League debut against Rubin Kazan, a 2–1 victory. He scored his first goal against Volga Nizhny Novgorod in a 1–1 away draw. On 1 July 2014, Krasnodar and Koman mutually terminated their contract, making Koman a free agent.

In August 2014, Hungarian League club Diósgyőr sought to sign Koman, but he rejected the offer. Koman's manager Bálint Kovács confirmed to Nemzeti Sport that Belgian Pro League club Club Brugge expressed interest in signing Koman in September 2014.

On 12 November 2014, Koman was named by American digital media company Bleacher Report as one of the most notable free agents available for the 2014–15 season, along with Víctor Valdés and Simão.

FC Ural (on loan)
Due to lack of playing time with Krasnodar, in the 2013 summer transfer window, Koman was loaned out to fellow Russian league club Ural Sverdlosk Oblast. He made his debut on 16 September 2013 against Dynamo Moscow, where he played the full match. On 15 May 2014, he scored his first goal in the 2013–14 Russian Premier League season on the 30th matchday against Volga Nizhny Novgorod, in the 45th minute. The match was won by Ural.

Diósgyőr
On 4 February 2015, Koman joined Hungarian League side Diósgyőr. On 1 August 2015, he scored his first goal for Diósgyőr in the 2015–16 Nemzeti Bajnokság I match in a 2–1 defeat against title-holders Videoton at the DVTK Stadion, Miskolc. He scored the goal from a penalty kick in the ninth minute. On 12 December 2015, he scored his second goal of the season against Békéscsaba 1912 Előre at the DVTK Stadion in the 61st minute.

According to the Croatian SportCom.hr, Croatian First League club Rijeka showed interest in signing Koman. The Croatian club was looking for a player to replace Moisés, who left Rijeka for Série A club Palmeiras.

Chennaiyin
On 4 September 2021, Koman joined Indian Super League side Chennaiyin on a one-year deal, ahead of the 2021–22 Indian Super League season. He debuted on 23 November against Hyderabad FC in a 1–0 win, where he scored the winner through penalty.

International career

Koman was part of the Hungary under-20 national team which finished third at the 2009 FIFA U-20 World Cup. He scored five goals in six matches, placing him second on the top goalscorers' list, behind Dominic Adiyiah of Ghana.

Koman was named to the Hungary senior team by head coach Erwin Koeman for the friendlies against Germany and the Netherlands in late May and early June 2010 respectively. He made his senior debut against Germany on 29 May 2010. Koman scored his first international goal against Moldova at the Szusza Ferenc Stadium in a UEFA Euro 2012 qualifying match, where Hungary won 2–1. He scored his second goal against San Marino at the Ferenc Puskás Stadium in another Euro 2012 qualifier. On 7 June 2011, Koman scored his third goal in Euro 2012 qualifying, again against San Marino. Hungary won the match 3–0 away in Serravalle, San Marino. He scored the first goal of the four against Iceland at the Ferenc Stadium, a 4–0 victory.

On 7 September 2012, Hungary began its 2014 FIFA World Cup qualifying campaign with a 5–0 away against Andorra, in which Koman scored Hungary's fifth goal, in the 82nd minute. On 16 October, Hungary battled-back to defeat Turkey 3–1 at home; Koman scored the match's equalizer. On 10 September 2013, Koman provided two assists – one for his former under-21 teammate Krisztián Németh and one for Tamás Hajnal – in a 5–1 victory over Estonia in a 2014 World Cup qualifier at the Ferenc Puskás Stadium.

Personal life
In June 2014, Koman married his Russian girlfriend Zarina at the Four Seasons Hotel in Budapest.

Career statistics

Club

International

Scores and results list Hungary's goal tally first, score column indicates score after each Koman goal.

Honours
Sampdoria
Trofeo Giacinto Facchetti: 2007–08

Hungary
 UEFA European Under-17 Championship: final tournament 2006
 UEFA European Under-19 Championship: semi-finalist 2008
 FIFA U-20 World Cup: third place 2009

Individual
 2009 FIFA U-20 World Cup Silver Shoe

References

External links
Vladimir Koman profile at magyarfutball.hu
Vladimir Koman at mlsz.hu

1989 births
Sportspeople from Uzhhorod
Hungarian people of Ukrainian descent
Living people
Hungarian footballers
Hungary youth international footballers
Hungary under-21 international footballers
Hungary international footballers
Association football midfielders
U.C. Sampdoria players
U.S. Avellino 1912 players
S.S.C. Bari players
AS Monaco FC players
FC Krasnodar players
FC Ural Yekaterinburg players
Diósgyőri VTK players
Adanaspor footballers
Sepahan S.C. footballers
Hatta Club players
Chennaiyin FC players
Serie A players
Serie B players
Ligue 2 players
Russian Premier League players
Nemzeti Bajnokság I players
Süper Lig players
TFF First League players
Persian Gulf Pro League players
UAE Pro League players
Indian Super League players
Nemzeti Bajnokság II players
Hungarian expatriate footballers
Expatriate footballers in Italy
Hungarian expatriate sportspeople in Italy
Expatriate footballers in Monaco
Hungarian expatriate sportspeople in Monaco
Expatriate footballers in Russia
Hungarian expatriate sportspeople in Russia
Expatriate footballers in Turkey
Hungarian expatriate sportspeople in Turkey
Expatriate footballers in Iran
Hungarian expatriate sportspeople in Iran
Expatriate footballers in the United Arab Emirates
Hungarian expatriate sportspeople in the United Arab Emirates
Expatriate footballers in India
Hungarian expatriate sportspeople in India